Complement factor H-related protein 3 is a protein that in humans is encoded by the CFHR3 gene.

References

Further reading

External links
  GeneReviews/NCBI/NIH/UW entry on Atypical Hemolytic-Uremic Syndrome
  OMIM entries on Atypical Hemolytic-Uremic Syndrome